Marasmius cladophyllus is a species of fungus in the family Marasmiaceae. Found in South America and Central America, it was described as new to science by English mycologist Miles Joseph Berkeley in 1856. A characteristic feature of the mushroom is the prominent ventricose (vein-like) pattern of the gills.

References

External links

cladophyllus
Fungi of Central America
Fungi of South America
Fungi described in 1856
Taxa named by Miles Joseph Berkeley